A diapir is a type of igneous intrusion in which a more mobile and ductily deformable material is forced into brittle overlying rocks. Depending on the tectonic environment, diapirs can range from idealized mushroom-shaped Rayleigh–Taylor-instability-type structures in regions with low tectonic stress such as in the Gulf of Mexico to narrow dikes of material that move along tectonically induced fractures in surrounding rock. 

The term was introduced by the Romanian geologist Ludovic Mrazek, who was the first to understand the principle of salt tectonics and plasticity. The term diapir may be applied to igneous structures, but it is more commonly applied to non-igneous, relatively cold materials, such as salt domes and mud diapirs.

Occurrence

Differential loading causes salt deposits covered by overburden (sediment) to rise upward toward the surface and pierce the overburden, forming diapirs (including salt domes), pillars, sheets, or other geological structures.

In addition to Earth-based observations, diapirism is thought to occur on Neptune's moon Triton, Jupiter's moon Europa, Saturn's moon Enceladus, and Uranus's moon Miranda.

Formation mechanisms

Diapirs commonly intrude buoyantly upward along fractures or zones of structural weakness through denser overlying rocks. This process is known as diapirism. The resulting structures are also referred to as piercement structures.

In the process, segments of the existing strata can be disconnected and pushed upwards. While moving higher, they retain many of their original properties, e.g. pressure; their pressure can be significantly different from the pressure of the shallower strata they get pushed into. Such overpressured "floaters" pose a significant risk when trying to drill through them. There is an analogy to a Galilean thermometer.

Rock types such as evaporitic salt deposits, and gas charged muds are potential sources of diapirs. Diapirs also form in the earth's mantle when a sufficient mass of hot, less dense magma assembles. Diapirism in the mantle is thought to be associated with the development of large igneous provinces and some mantle plumes.

Explosive, hot volatile rich magma or volcanic eruptions are referred to generally as diatremes. Diatremes are not usually associated with diapirs, as they are small-volume magmas which ascend by volatile plumes, not by density contrast with the surrounding mantle.

Economic importance

Diapirs or piercement structures are structures resulting from the penetration of overlaying material. By pushing upward and piercing overlying rock layers, diapirs can form anticlines (arch-like shape folds), salt domes (mushroom/dome-shaped diapirs), and other structures capable of trapping hydrocarbons such as petroleum and natural gas. Igneous intrusions themselves are typically too hot to allow the preservation of preexisting hydrocarbons.

See also

References

Economic geology
Geological processes
Intrusions
Salt domes
Structural geology
Structure of the Earth